César Horacio Duarte Jáquez (born April 14, 1963) is a Mexican politician, a member of the Institutional Revolutionary Party, who has twice been a federal deputy. He was President of the Chamber of Deputies of Mexico from 2008 to 2009, while representing Chihuahua's ninth district, and he served as Governor of Chihuahua for the period 2010 to 2016.  
César Duarte is currently under investigation for corruption and an arrest warrant against him and other close members of his government was issued on March 27, 2017. According to the Financial Times in 2018, he was "believed to be in Texas." He was arrested in Miami in July 2020.

Personal life and education
César Duarte Jáquez was born in Hidalgo de Parral, Chihuahua in April 1963. He studied at the Universidad del Valle de México and became a lawyer.

Career
Duarte Jáquez joined the Institutional Revolutionary Party (PRI) in 1977 and became a municipal and state advisor to PRI. He became general secretary and president of the Hidalgo del Parral Municipality.

He became head of the Confederación Nacional Campesina (National Farmers' Confederation) of Chihuahua and secretary of the organization's executive board.

Duarte Jáquez went on to become an at-large deputy in the Chihuauhua State Legislature (September 1, 2000 – August 31, 2003), deputy from the 9th District (September 1, 2006 – August 31, 2009), and president of the Chamber of Deputies (September 1, 2008 – August 31, 2009). He was Governor of Chihuauhua from October 4, 2010 to October 3, 2016, after which he was accused of peculation of MXN $275 million. He was expelled from PRI in January 2019.

His government investigated the Chihuahua monster truck accident.

Accusations
Duarte Jáquez is accused of owning 50 different properties possibly acquired with public monies, with a value of US $200 million, in the United States. This is in addition to the 21 pieces of property—ranches, cattle, and machinery worth between MXN $1 billion and $1.2 billion—already seized in Mexico. The total fraud may amount to MXN $6 billion (US $267,500,000).

As of January 21, 2021, Duarte was being held in a prison in Florida.

References

1963 births
21st-century Mexican politicians
Living people
Institutional Revolutionary Party politicians
Governors of Chihuahua (state)
Presidents of the Chamber of Deputies (Mexico)
Mexican politicians convicted of crimes
Fugitives wanted by Mexico
Politicians from Chihuahua (state)
People from Parral, Chihuahua
Universidad del Valle de México alumni